The below list contains most important Hungarian botanists in alphabetical order, indicating their main biographical dates and fields of botany in which they have been researching.

A
  Sámuel Ab Hortis (1729–1792) plant physiology
  Éva Ács (born 1964) phycology
  József Agnelli (1852–1923) agricultural botany, medical botany
  László Almádi (born 1936) herbology, plant systematics
  István Ambrózy (1869–1933) floristics, horticulture
  József Andrasovszky (1889–1943) ampelography
  Gábor Andreánszky (1895–1967) phytogeography, paleobotany
  Lambert Angeli (1916–1971) agricultural botany
  Dezső Angyal (1852–1936) pomology
  Dániel Antal (1901–1972) agricultural botany, pomology
  Béla Augustin (1877–1954) medical botany

B
  Nándor Bacsó (1904–1974) plant ecology
  Leona Baksay (1915 – c. 2005) plant physiology, plant systematics
  Sándor Bálint (1860–1922) ampelography
  József Balogh (1750 – c. 1781) floristics
  Henrik Band (1840–1913) floristics, horticulture
  Zoltán Barabás (1926–1993) agricultural botany
  Aurél Baranyai (1903–1983) medical botany
  Zoltán Baráth (1924–1982) phytosociology, plant systematics, floristics
  Béla Barna (1931–1979) agricultural botany, pomology
  Beáta Mária Barnabás (born 1948) agricultural botany
  Károly Baross (1865–1905) ampelography
  László Baross (1865–1938) agricultural botany
  István Barra (1900–1986) ampelography, phytopathology
  István Barra (1805–1865) plant systematics
  József Barth (1833–1915) floristics
  Bertalan Baskay Tóth (1903–1976) agricultural botany
  Károly Bátky (1794–1859) agricultural botany
  János Keresztély Baumgarten (1756–1843) floristics
  Jenő Bayer (1932–1970) phytochemistry
  Zoltán Bedő (born 1951) agricultural botany
  László Beke (1881–1950) agricultural botany, phytopathology
  Miklós Békésy (1903–1980) agricultural botany, medical botany
  László Benedek (1901–1977) agricultural botany
  Dániel Benkő (1799–1883) agricultural botany
  Máté Bereczki (1824–1895) pomology
  Lajos Bontovics (1929–1987) agricultural botany
  József Benkő (1740–1814) floristics, medical botany
  Jenő Bernátsky (1873–1944) phytosociology, plant systematics, phytopathology, mycology
  Péter Betegh (1884–1969) medical botany
  István Beythe (1532–1612) floristics, mycology
  Gyula Bihari (1889–1977) herbology
  Gyula Bittera (1893–1970) agricultural botany, medical botany
  Miklós Bittera (1887–1947) agricultural botany
  Tibor Blattny (1883–1969) forestry
  Béla Bodnár (1932–1960) floristics, phytogeography
  János Bodnár (1889–1953) phytochemistry
  István Bodócs (1887–1965) plant morphology
  Pál Bodor (1773–1828) pomology
  György Bodrogközy (born 1924) phytosociology, plant ecology
  János Bolla (1806–1881) floristics, mycology
  Pál Bolza (1861–1947) horticulture
  Vinczé von Borbás (1844–1905) floristics, plant systematics, phytosociology
  Attila Borhidi (born 1932) plant systematics, floristics, phytosociology
  Ádám Boros (1900–1973) floristics, bryology, phycology
  Rezső Boros (1925–1968) pomology
  Olga Borsos (1926–1996) plant systematics, plant morphology
  György Böckh (1822–1874) phytogeography
  János Bruder (1913–1982) agricultural botany
  József Budai (1851–1939) pomology, floristics

C
  László Cholnoky (1899–1967) phytochemistry
  Kornél Chyzer (1836–1909) floristics
  Ottó Claader (1907–1985) phytochemistry
  József Csapó (1734–1799) medical botany
  József Csapó M. (1911–1979) agricultural botany
  István Csapody (1930–2002) forestry, floristics
  Vera Csapody (1890–1985) floristics, plant systematics, plant physiology
  Kálmán Csatári-Szüts (1912–1973) agricultural botany
  János Csató (1833–1913) floristics
  Adolf Cserey (1851–1918) plant systematics
  Farkas Cserey (1773–1842) floristics
  Sándor Cserháti (1852–1909) agricultural botany
  József Csókás (1824–1905) ampelography
  János Csolsch (fl. 18th–19th century) horticulture
  Szabó István Csonti (1895–1960) agricultural botany
  Zoltán Csorba (1904–1981) phytopathology, mycology
  István Csűrös (1914–1998) floristics, phytosociology
  Kálmán Czakó (1843–1895) agricultural botany
  Nándor Czeiner (1850–1928) ampelography
  Antal Czetz (1801–1865) floristics
  Gyula Czimber (born 1936) herbology

D
  Ágnes Dániel (1929–1986) phytochemistry, plant physiology
  Lajos Dániel (1902–1978) pomology
  Ferenc Darvas (1883–1934) medical botany
  Zsolt Debreczy (born 1941) dendrology, bryology
  János Kristóf Deccard (1686–1764) floristics
  János Vilmos Deccard (1722–1778) floristics
  Árpád Degen (1866–1934) floristics, plant morphology, agricultural botany
  Imre Deininger (1844–1918) agricultural botany, paleoethnobotany
  Károly Demeter (1852–1890) bryology
  Dezső Dicenty (1879–1965) ampelography
  Sámuel Diószegi (1760–1813) plant systematics
  Géza Károly Doby (1877–1968) phytochemistry
  Gábor Doleschall (1813–1891) plant physiology
  János Domokos (1904–1978) horticulture
  József Dorner (1808–1873) plant morphology
  Lajos Dőry (1904–1977) agricultural botany

E
  István László Endlicher (1804–1849) plant systematics
  Ferenc Entz (1805–1877) ampelography
  József Ercsei (1792–1868) floristics
  József Ernyey (1874–1945) history of botany

F
  Sándor Fáber (1874–1933) agricultural botany
  János Fábry (1830–1907) floristics
  Géza Facsar (born 1941) plant systematics, paleoethnobotany, horticulture
  Béla Faludi (1909–1984) plant morphology
  Gábor Farkas (1925–1986) plant physiology, plant morphology, phytopathology
  Loránd Farkas (1914–1986) phytochemistry
  Mihály Farkas (1833–1900) agricultural botany
  Mihály Fazekas (1766–1828) plant systematics
  Dániel Fehér (1890–1955) forestry, plant physiology
  Sándor Feichtinger (1817–1907) floristics
  Gábor Fekete (born 1930) floristics, phytogeography, phytosociology
  József Fekete (1842–1906) horticulture
  Lajos Fekete (1837–1916) forestry
  Zoltán Fekete (1877–1962) forestry, phytogeography
  Lajos Felföldy (born 1920) phycology
  Ferenc Fellner (1847–1913) horticulture
  Lajos Fialowski (1846–1909) history of botany
  Nándor Filarszky (1858–1941) phycology, plant morphology, plant systematics
  Károly Flatt (1853–1906) agricultural botany, history of botany
  Rudolf Fleischmann (1879–1950) agricultural botany
  Ferenc Fóriss (1892–1977) floristics, lichenology
  János Földi (1755–1801) plant systematics
  Rezső Francé (1874–1943) phytopathology, phycology
  Alfonz Sándor Freh (1832–1915) floristics
  Vilmos Frenyó (1908–1998) plant physiology
  János Fridvaldszky (1730–1784) dendrology
  Loránd Fridvaldszky (1923–1994) plant morphology
  Imre Frivaldszky (1799–1870) floristics
  Mihály Fucskó (1885–1914) plant morphology, plant physiology
  Mihály Fuss (1814–1883) floristics

G
  Miklós Galántai (1937–2005) horticulture
  László Gallé (1908–1980) phytopathology, lichenology
  Gyula Gáyer (1883–1932) plant systematics, phytogeography, floristics
  Samuel Genersich (1768–1844) floristics
  János Ádám Gensel (1677–1720) floristics
  István Gergely (1877–1960) pomology
  Guido Gerhárdt (1876–1939) agricultural botany
  Rezső Geschwind (1829–1910) horticulture
  György Lajos Gillemot (1813–1892) horticulture
  Nándor Gimesi (1892–1953) plant physiology, plant morphology, phycology
  Rudolf Giovannini (1891–1963) medical botany
  Károly Gomba (1889–1916) plant morphology
  Endre Gombocz (1882–1945) floristics, plant systematics, history of botany
  István Gondola (1922–1970) agricultural botany, herbology
  Jenő Görög (1920–1978) phytopathology, mycology
  Emil Grabner (1878–1955) agricultural botany, medical botany
  Pál Greguss (1889–1984) plant physiology, plant morphology
  Ferenc Greinich (1867–1942) floristics
  Irma Greisiger (1882–1947) bryology floristics
  György Griger (1879–1946) horticulture
  Béla Gróf (1883–1936) agricultural botany, phytopathology
  Ferenc Gruber (1905–1971) agricultural botany
  Ignác Grundl (1813–1878) floristics
  Antal Gulyás (1884–1980) phytopathology
  József Gulyás (1917–1979) phytochemistry
  József Gyárfás (1875–1965) agricultural botany
  Barna Győrffy (1911–1970) plant physiology
  István Győrffy (1880–1959) bryology
  József György (1813–1862) floristics
  Antal Gyürki (1817–1890) ampelography

H
  Károly Haberle (1764–1832) plant systematics
  Lilla Hably (born 1953) paleobotany
  Márta Halász (1905–1971) phycology
  János Halmai (1903–1973) medical botany
  Lajos Haracsi (1898–1978) erdészeti phytopathology
  Árpád Haraszty (1907–1987) plant morphology, plant physiology
  Zoltán Hargitai (1912–1945) floristics, phytosociology
  Lajos Haynald (1816–1891) floristics
  András Háznagy (1913–1987) medical botany
  Bertalan Hazslinszky (1902–1966) plant morphology, veterinary botany
  Frigyes Ákos Hazslinszky (1818–1896) floristics, mycology, lichenology, bryology, phycology
  Dezső Hegyi (1873–1926) phytopathology, mycology
  Árpád Hensch (1847–1913) agricultural botany
  Márton Herczeg (1936–1987) agricultural botany
  László Heszky (born 1945) agricultural botany
  János Heuffel (1800–1857) floristics
  Ede Heykal (1844–1929) horticulture, pomology
  Ferenc Hollendonner (1882–1935) plant morphology, paleoethnobotany
  László Hollós (1859–1940) mycology, floristics
  András Horánszky (born 1928) floristics, plant systematics, dendrology
  János Horn (1881–1958) pomology
  Miklós Horn (1899–1965) agricultural botany
  Tibor Hortobágyi (1912–1990) phycology, plant systematics, agricultural botany
  Adolf Olivér Horvát (1907–2006) floristics, phytosociology
  Ernő Horváth (1929–1990) floristics
  Imre Horváth (1926–1979) plant ecology, forestry
  József Horváth (born 1936) agricultural botany, phytopathology
  János Hulják (1883–1942) floristics
  Béla Husz (1892–1954) phytopathology, mycology

I
  József Igmándy (1897–1950) floristics, bryology
  Zoltán Igmándy (1925–2000) forestry, mycology
  Károly Irk (1882–1924) medical botany
  István Isépy (born 1942) medical botany
  Gyula Istvánffi (1860–1930) plant morphology, phycology, mycology, ampelography

J
  Jenő Jablonszky (1892–1975) plant systematics, paleobotany
  Miklós József Jacquin (1727–1817) floristics
  István Jakobey (1901–1971) agricultural botany
  Pál Jakucs (1928–2000) phytosociology, plant ecology
  Béla Jámbor (1917–1971) plant physiology, plant morphology
  Viktor Janka (1837–1890) floristics, plant systematics
  Andor Jánossy (1908–1975) agricultural botany
  Sándor Jávorka (1883–1961) floristics, plant systematics
  József Jeanplong (born 1919) floristics, phytogeography, phytosociology
  Endre Jeney (1891–1970) phytochemistry
  Miklós Juhász (born 1938) palynology
  Pál Juhász-Nagy (1935–1993) plant ecology
  Lajos Jurányi (1837–1897) plant morphology, plant physiology

K
  János Kabay (1896–1936) medical botany
  Ágoston Kanitz (1843–1896) floristics, history of botany
  Károly Kaplonyi (1918–1971) agricultural botany, plant physiology
  Bertalan Karmacsi (1898–1977) pomology
  Rezső Károly (1868–1945) agricultural botany
  Árpád Károlyi (1907–1972) floristics, bryology
  István Kárpáti (1924–1989) phycology
  Zoltán Kárpáti (1909–1972) floristics, phytogeography, plant systematics, dendrology
  Mihály Dénes Katona (1782–1874) agricultural botany
  Zsigmond Katona (1828–1902) pomology, ampelography
  Gusztáv Adolf Kayser (1817–1878) floristics
  Miklós Kedves (1933–2003) palynology
  Jenő Keller (1917 – c. 1945) plant systematics
  Kálmán Kenessey (1822–1913) agricultural botany
  József Kerekes (1924–1973) agricultural botany, medical botany
  Elek Kerényi (1916–1963) horticulture
  Herman Kern (1876–1957) phytopathology, mycology
  Kálmán Kerpely (1864–1940) agricultural botany
  Pál Kitaibel (1757–1817) floristics
  Gyula Klein (1844–1915) phycology, mycology, plant morphology
  Antal Kodolányi (1835–1910) agricultural botany, plant morphology
  Erzsébet Kol (1897–1980) phycology
  Károly Kolbai (1901–1972) agricultural botany
  Pál Kolbány (1758–1816) phytochemistry
  Kálmán Kolecsányi (1886–1960) horticulture
  Magda Komlódi (born 1931) floristics, palynology
  István Koren (1805–1893) floristics
  Gyula Korponay (1888–1975) pomology, gyümölcskórtan
  Tamás Kosutány (1848–1915) agricultural botany, plant physiology
  Ervin Iván Kovács (1934–1987) plant morphology
  János Kovács (1816–1906) floristics
  Margit Kovács (born 1930) floristics, phytosociology
  Ferenc Kovács Huszka (1869–1944) floristics
  Ferenc Kováts (1873–1956) plant systematics
  Gyula Kováts (1815–1873) paleobotany, floristics
  Károly Kovatsits (1876–1929) agricultural botany
  Dénes Kozma (1875–1925) herbology
  Vilmos Kőfaragó-Gyelnik (1906–1945) lichenology
  Tamás Kőmíves (born 1944) agricultural botany
  Ferenc Kövessi (1875–1945) plant physiology, ampelography
  János György Kramer (1684–1744) plant systematics, medical botany
  András Kubacska (1871–1942) plant morphology, kertészeti növénytan
  Ágoston Kubinyi (1799–1873) floristics
  Samu Kupcsok (1850–1914) floristics
  Jenő Béla Kümmerle (1876–1931) plant morphology, pteridológia
  István Kwaysser (1915–1982) ampeleológus

L
  Adolf Ferenc Láng (1795–1863) floristics
  Géza Láng (1916–1980) agricultural botany
  Samuel Lasz (1859–1930) climatology, zoology, and geology
  Gábor László (1878–1960) ősnövénytan, phytosociology
  Ödön Legány (1876–1944) agricultural botany
  Ferenc Legányi (1884–1964) paleobotany
  Ödön Lehner (1887–1938) pomology
  János Leibitzer (1763–1817) pomology
  Géza Lengyel (1884–1965) agricultural botany, floristics
  Lajos Letenyei (1822–1868) agricultural botany
  Viktor Ligeti (1912–1986) phytochemistry
  Károly Limbacher (1868–1937) pomology
  György Linhart (1844–1925) agricultural botany, phytopathology
  János Lippai (1606–1666) pomology
  Károly Frigyes Loew (1699–1741) floristics
  Hugó Lojka (1844–1887) floristics, lichenology
  István Lumnitzer (1747–1806) floristics

M
  Sándor Mágócsy-Dietz (1855–1945) plant physiology, dendrology, mycology
  Gyula Magyar (1884–1945) agricultural botany, pomology, horticulture
  Pál Magyar (1895–1969) forestry, plant systematics, phytosociology
  Gyula Magyary-Kossa (1865–1944) medical botany
  Antal Majer (1910–1996) forestry
  Móric Májer (1815–1904) floristics
  György Mándy (1913–1976) agricultural botany, plant morphology
  István Manninger (1920–1990) agricultural botany, phytopathology
  Ferenc Marc (1813–1900) kertészeti növénytan
  Antal Margittai (1880–1939) floristics
  Sándor Márkus (1831–1867) phycology, floristics
  László Martos (1930–1957) plant physiology
  Imre Máthé, sr. (1911–1993) floristics, plant ecology, agricultural botany, phytochemistry, medical botany
  Imre Máthé, jr. (born 1942) phytochemistry, plant ecology
  Tamás Mauksch (1749–1832) floristics, mycology
  Gyula Méhes (1897–1970) medical botany
  Juhász Péter Méliusz (1532–1572) floristics
  László Menyhárth (1849–1897) floristics
  Ákos Mesterházy (born 1945) agricultural botany, phytopathology
  Lajos Mészáros (1913–1969) agricultural botany, plant morphology
  Gyula Mészöly (1910–1974) agricultural botany
  Gyula Mezey (1861–1922) phytopathology
  István Milkovits (born 1937) plant systematics
  László Miltényi (1901–1936) agricultural botany, plant morphology
  József Misák (1866–1939) horticulture
  Vidor Modor (1910–1979) medical botany, plant morphology
  Gusztáv Moesz (1873–1946) mycology, phytopathology, floristics, phytogeography
  Sámuel Mokry (1832–1909) agricultural botany
  Ádám Molnár (1713–1780) floristics
  Dezső Morbitzer (1879–1945) kertészeti növénytan
  Vilmos Mühle (1845–1908) kertészeti növénytan
  Ferenc Mygind (1710–1789) floristics

N
  István Nagy (1905–1974) floristics
  Zoltán Nagy (1921–1987) agricultural botany
  Miksa Natter-Nád (1893–1982) plant systematics
  Márton Németh (1910–1986) ampelography
  Ernő Nemky (1909–1986) forestry, plant ecology
  Károly Nendtvich (1811–1892) floristics
  Tamás Nendtvich (1782–1858) floristics
  Antal Nowotarski (1825–1901) agricultural botany
  Antal Nyárády (1920–1982) floristics, phytosociology
  Erazmus Gyula Nyárády (1881–1966) floristics, plant systematics

O
  Ernő Obermayer (1888–1969) agricultural botany, plant physiology
  Iván Okályi (1900–1968) pomology
  Miklós Olgyay (1904–1958) phytopathology
  Sándor Orbán (born 1947) bryology
  Miklós Ormándy (1846–1911) plant morphology
  Ottó Orsós (1911–1939) plant morphology

P
  Árpád Paál (1889–1943) plant physiology
  Piroska Palik (1895–1966) phycology
  Gyula Pálinkás (1883–1957) ampelography
  József Pantocsek (1846–1916) phycology, floristics
  György Pántos (1924–1986) forestry, plant ecology
  József Papp (1900–1985) agricultural botany, dendrology
  Béla Páter (1860–1938) agricultural botany, medical botany
  Ármin Pecz (1820–1896) horticulture
  Antal Pénzes (1895–1984) pomology, floristics
  József Péterffy (1827–1888) agricultural botany
  István Péterfi (1906–1978) plant morphology, plant physiology, phycology
  Márton Péterfi (1875–1922) bryology
  Ferenc Petrányi (1890–1935) horticulture
  Sándor Pettenkoffer (1868–1946) ampelography
  Benő Pillitz (1825–1910) floristics
  Tamás Pócs (born 1933) floristics, bryology, phytosociology
  János Podhradszky (1914–1968) phytopathology
  György Pogácsás (1919–1977) agricultural botany, plant physiology, phytopathology
  Sándor Polgár (1876–1944) floristics, phytogeography
  Béla Pozsár (1922–1981) agricultural botany, plant physiology, phytochemistry
  István Précsényi (1926–2007) phytosociology, plant ecology
  Szaniszló Priszter (born 1917) floristics, plant systematics, history of botany
  György Purkircher (1530–1577) medical botany

Q
  József Quint (1882–1929) phycology, plant physiology

R
  Ferenc Raffensberger (1851–1936) horticulture
  Miklós Rajczy (?) bryology
  László Rakcsányi (1901–1967) ampelography
  Rajmund Rapaics (1885–1954) phytogeography, plant systematics, phytosociology
  Klára M. Rásky (1908–1971) paleobotany
  Károly Rayger (1641–1707) medical botany
  Rezső Rédl (1895–1942) floristics, phytogeography
  Dezső Révy (1900–1954) phytopathology
  Aladár Richter (1868–1927) plant morphology
  Gusztáv Ritter (1846–1926) pomology
  Zoltán Roboz (1861–1905) ampelography
  Antal Rochel (1770–1847) floristics
  Pál Rom (1902–1962) medical botany
  István Rudinai Molnár (1850–1920) ampelography, pomology

S
  István Saágy (1865–1945) horticulture
  József Sadler (1791–1849) floristics, plant systematics, pteridológia, mycology
  László Sántha (1886–1954) ampelography, phytopathology, lichenology
  Aladár Scherffel (1865–1939) phycology, mycology
  Vilmos Aurél Scherffel (1835–1895) floristics, mycology
  Károly Schilberszky (1863–1935) phytopathology, mycology
  Zsigmond Schiller (1847–1920) floristics
  József Schneider (1888–1963) horticulture
  Ferdinánd Schur (1799–1878) floristics
  János Schuster (1777–1839) plant systematics
  Tibor Simon (born 1926) floristics, plant systematics, phytosociology
  Lajos Simonkai (1851–1910) floristics, plant systematics, dendrology
  Károly Rezső Soó (1903–1980) floristics, phytogeography, phytosociology, plant systematics
  István Soós (1902–1959) ampelography
  Móric Staub (1842–1914) paleobotany, floristics
  János Suba (born 1929) floristics, plant physiology
  Zoltán Szabó (1882–1944) floristics, plant systematics, plant physiology
  Kálmán Szász (1910–1978) medical botany
  Ödön Szatala (1889–1958) lichenology
  Gusztáv Szelényi (1904–1982) phytopathology
  Gábor Szemes (1906–1993) phycology
  Imre Szenczy (1798–1860) floristics
  Gabriella Szentpéteri (1927–1969) plant morphology
  Rezső Szép (1860–1918) floristics
  Júlia Szepes (1913–1987) plant morphology, phytopathology
  János Szepesfalvy (1882–1959) bryology, paleobotany
  Zoltán Szilády (1878–1947) floristics
  István Szodfridt (born 1930) dendrology, history of botany
  Miklós Szontágh (1843–1899) floristics
  Gyula Szökő (1934–1974) phytopathology
  Mihály Szörényi (1881–1963) horticulture
  Júlia Szujkóné Lacza (born 1930) floristics, dendrology, plant morphology
  Frigyes Szutorisz (1854–1926) floristics

T
  Pál Tallós (1931–1968) forestry, phytosociology
  Géza Tamássy (1887–1971) floristics
  Károly Tamássy (1806–1885) pomology
  Gyula Ágoston Tauscher (1832–1882) floristics
  Károly Téglás (1864–1916) forestry
  András Terpó (born 1925) pomology
  Lajos Thaisz (1867–1937) agricultural botany, floristics
  Lajos Timár (1918–1956) floristics, phytosociology, mycology
  György Timkó (1881–1945) lichenology
  Lajos Tőkés (1873–1951) floristics, phytogeography
  Róbert Trautmann (1873–1953) plant systematics
  János Tuzson (1870–1943) plant morphology, plant systematics, floristics, phytopathology, mycology, paleobotany

U
  Gábor Ubrizsy (1919–1973) phytopathology, mycology, herbology
  Gábor Uherkovich (1912–2002) phycology
  József Ujhelyi (1910–1979) floristics, plant systematics
  Miklós Ujvárosi (1913–1981) agricultural botany, floristics, herbology
  Ferenc Uzonyi (1884–1972) phytopathology

V
  Dezső Vágújfalvi (born 1936) plant physiology, phytochemistry
  Ernő Vajda (1889–1980) floristics
  László Vajda (1890–1986) floristics
  Oszkár Varga (1873–1947) plant physiology
  István Velich (1870–1960) pomology
  Klára Verseghy (born 1930) lichenology
  Antal Veszelszki (c. 1730 – 1798) floristics
  György Vette (1645–1704) phytopathology
  Gábor Vida (born 1935) floristics, plant systematics, pteridológia
  Aladár Visnya (1878–1959) bryology
  Márton Vrabély (1808–1877) floristics

W
  János Wágner (1870–1955) floristics, dendrology
  Richárd Wagner (1905–1972) plant ecology
  Antal Waisbecker (1835–1916) floristics
  Ferenc Ádám Waldstein-Wartenberg (1759–1823) floristics
  Lajos Walz (1845–1914) floristics
  János Jakab Wernischek (1743–1804) plant systematics
  Péter Wierzbicki (1794–1847) floristics
  János Teofil Windisch (1689–1732) floristics
  József Jakab Winterl (1739–1809) plant systematics, pomology
  András Rafael Wolny (1759–1827) floristics

Z
  Vilmos Zoltán (1869–1929) floristics
  Bálint Zólyomi (1908–1997) növényszármazástan, phytosociology, palynology
  Zoltán Zsák (1880–1966) agricultural botany, floristics, herbology

See also
 List of botanists

Sources 
Magyar életrajzi lexikon 1000–1990 [Hungarian biographical encyclopaedia from 1000 until 1990], Budapest, Arcanum, 2001.
Magyarország a XX. században [Hungary in the 20th century], vol. 4, Szekszárd, Babits, 2000, pp. 481–489.
Homepage of the Hungarian Academy of Sciences

Hungarian
Botanists